The 1936 Isle of Man Tourist Trophy saw Norton rider Jimmie Guthrie win the Senior, and come fifth in the Junior. The Junior was won by Freddie Frith in his first year on the Norton team, and the Lightweight was won by Bob Foster on a New Imperial.

Following on from the dramatic win by Stanley Woods in the 1935 Senior TT Race, the 1936 Junior TT Race proved to be highly controversial and was marred by disqualification and protest. As Moto Guzzi were involved in war production for the crisis in Abyssinia, Stanley Woods rode for Velocette in the 1936 Junior TT but retired at Sulby on lap 1 with engine problems. After leading for five laps, Jimmie Guthrie was forced to stop between Hillberry and Signpost Corner to replace the drive chain. Although Jimmie Guthrie continued in 2nd place the lead passed to Norton team-mate Freddie Frith who had joined the team after winning the 1935 Junior Manx Grand Prix. At Parliament Square in Ramsey on lap 6, Jimmie Guthrie was 'black-flagged' for receiving outside assistance and disqualified. The Norton race team protested the disqualification and Jimmie Guthrie was posted in 5th place in the final race classification and was awarded 2nd place prize money.

In the Senior TT race Harold Daniell and George Rowley rode supercharged AJS V4s, but despite their high top speed, the bikes lacked acceleration. Both riders retired due to mechanical problems.

The 1936 Lightweight TT Race was held after being delayed for a day because of mist and fog on the Mountain Course. The 1936 Lightweight Race proved to be closely contested by Bob Foster riding for New Imperial and Stanley Woods riding the 3 cylinder supercharged 250 cc DKW who retired on lap 7 after stopping to change a spark-plug.

Senior TT (500 cc)
19 June 1936 – 7 laps (264.11 miles) Mountain Course.

Junior TT (350 cc)
16 June 1936 – 7 laps (264.11 miles) Mountain Course.

Lightweight TT (250 cc)
18 June 1936 – 7 laps (264.11 miles) Mountain Course.

Notes
 Wal Handley crashes a Riley belonging to Freddie Dixon at Brooklands during the British Empire Trophy and breaks an arm.
 Prize money for the 1936 Senior TT Race is 1st place £120, 2nd place £80 and 3rd place £70. For the 1936 Junior TT and Lightweight TT Races is 1st place £100, 2nd place £60 and 3rd place £50.
 During the 1936 Junior TT Race, Noel Christmas retires at the TT Grandstand and H.G.Tyrell Smith at Creg-na-Baa with engine problems on lap 2. On lap 6, E.R.Thomas in 2nd place slips of at the Quarterbridge. He continues, but stops on the Ballahutchin Hill to straighten handle-bars and foot-rest, but is eventually black-flagged.
 During lap 2 of the 1936 Lightweight TT Race, O.Steinbach riding for DKW stopped at Ballaugh with engine problems and L.G. Martin riding a Cotton motor-cycle crashes at Sulby.

Sources

External links
 Detailed race results
 Isle of Man TT winners
 Mountain Course map

Isle of Man TT
1936
Isle